Miaenia fasciata is a species of beetle in the family Cerambycidae. It was described by Matsushita in 1943.

References

Miaenia
Beetles described in 1943